Philosophical Thoughts is a 1746 book composed by Denis Diderot; it was his first original work.

Content
In this book, Diderot argued for a reconciliation of reason with feeling so as to establish harmony. According to Diderot, without feeling there would be a detrimental effect on virtue and no possibility of creating any sublime work. However, since feeling without discipline can be destructive, reason was necessary to rein in feeling.

At the time Diderot wrote this book he was a deist. Hence there is a defense of deism in this book, and some arguments against atheism. The book also contains criticism of any kind of self-torture, including self-flagellation. For the 1770 edition of the work, Diderot included some additional material which contained even greater heresies; this included explicit criticism of Christianity, and contempt for theologians.

Reception
In July 1746, the Parlement of Paris condemned the book and ordered it to be burned in public.This enhanced the book's popularity. Since the book was very well written, and since Diderot preferred not to reveal himself as its author, it was thought by both Diderot's friends and enemies that the work was of some established author like Voltaire, La Mettrie, or Condillac.

Notes

References

Denis Diderot